Gymnoscelis erymna is a moth in the family Geometridae. It was described by Edward Meyrick in 1886. It is found on Tonga and Fiji, as well as in Australia.

References

Moths described in 1886
erymna
Taxa named by Edward Meyrick